"Move Any Mountain" is a song by Scottish electronic music group the Shamen, first released under the title "Pro›gen". With an official remix by the Beatmasters, the song was re-released in the UK in summer 1991 and was their first top-10 single, reaching number four in the UK Singles Chart. It was included on the band's second album, En-Tact (1990), and is also their only top-40 hit in the US, where the song peaked at number 38 on the Billboard Hot 100 in February 1992.

Release
In response to demand for remixes from fans, the band released the entire sample list and a number of remixes on the album Progeny, which at the time meant the single and album release of the track made it the only record to chart on both UK Singles and Album Charts at the same time.

The track was used for the entrance of Team Scotland during the opening ceremony of the 2014 Commonwealth Games at Celtic Park in Glasgow. The lyrics of the first verse also appeared as Super Hans' wedding vows in the second episode of the ninth series of Peep Show.

The cover includes the kanji 山 (yama, meaning mountain).

Critical reception
AllMusic editor John Bush viewed the song as an "infectious techno-pop anthem". Upon the release of "Progen", Bill Coleman from Billboard described it as "an aggressive track that makes no bones about blurring the lines between industrial and house music." Another editor, Larry Flick, felt that the track "may be best remembered as the most remixed record in history", adding that "at last count, there are 35 versions of this song circulating throughout Europe, seven of which are on this U.S. pressing. Beneath abundant studio tricks, which alter song's stance from techno to house and then hi-NRG, lies a simplistic and memorable modern-pop tune." Andy Kastanas from The Charlotte Observer deemed it "a bright uptempo dance trip that will have your hiney shakin' before you can say "rave"." 

Dave Jennings from Melody Maker wrote, "'Pro›gen', starts brightly — the Shamen set up a spun-sugar dance sequence, croon "move any mountain", and you begin to believe that they could. Then in crashes guest rapper Mr C, rambling feebly and implausibly about his supernatural abilities, and the record descends to the depths of mediocre rap-ego-stroking. Shame!" David Giles from Music Week stated that the Shamen "are at their pulsating, electrobeat best; a couple of rapping inserts from DJ Mr C rather detracts from the hypnotic overall feel, but it should enhance the record's credibility yet further in clubland." James Hamilton from Record Mirror viewed the track as an "catchy chanting I can move, move, move any mountain UK oldie". William Shaw from Smash Hits complimented its "humping great tower block of a hugely infectious dance chorus."

Music video
The promotional video for "Move Any Mountain" was filmed on the slopes of Mount Teide, Tenerife. Shortly afterwards, Will Sinnott drowned off the coast of the neighbouring island La Gomera.

UK releases

 Pro›gen (CD single 1990)
 "Pro›gen ('Land of Oz' Mix)" – 5:42
 "Light›span" – 5:41
 "Pre›gen" – 5:48

 Pro›gen Remixes (12-inch single 1990)
 "Pro›gen (C-mix F+)" – 7:01
 "Pro›gen (7b)" – 3:50
 "Light›span (Soundwave)" – 7:43

 Pro›gen (Cassette single 1990)
 "Pro›gen (C-mix F-)"
 "Pro›gen ('Land of Oz')"
 "Light›span"
 "Pro›gen (7a)"

 Move Any Mountain – Progen 91 (CD single 1991)
 "Move Any Mountain (Beat Edit)" (remixed by the Beatmasters) – 3:30
 "Move Any Mountain (Landslide Edit)" (remixed by the Kid & John) – 3:48
 "Move Any Mountain (F2 Mello) – 6:12
 "Move Any Mountain (Mountains in the Sky)" (remixed by Caspar Pound) – 6:03

 Move Any Mountain – Progen 91 (12-inch single 1991)
 "Move Any Mountain (Landslide)" (remixed by the Kid & John) – 4:51
 "Move Any Mountain (Devil)" (remixed by 'Evil' Eddie Richards) – 4:40
 "Move Any Mountain (Rude)" (remixed by the Goat) – 5:03
 "Move Any Mountain (I.R.P. in the Land of Oz)" (remixed by Paul Oakenfold) – 5:02

 Progeny (3x12"/cassette 1991)
 "Move Any Mountain (Bang to the Beat of the Drum)" (remixed by Bryan 'Chuck' New & 'Evil' Eddie Richards) – 5:45
 "Move Any Mountain (Beltram Dub)" (remixed by Joey Beltram) – 5:30
 "Move Any Mountain (Rising High Dub)" (remixed by Caspar Pound) – 7:25
 "Move Any Mountain (Alta Vista)" (remixed by F Troop) – 6:16
 "Move Any Mountain (The Prelude to Paradise)" (remixed by Frankie Bones) – 5:12
 "Move Any Mountain (666 Edit)" (remixed by 'Evil' Eddie Richards) – 4:49
 "Move Any Mountain (Land of Oz)" (remixed by Paul Oakenfold) – 5:44
 "Move Any Mountain (Beatmasters Dub)" (remixed by The Beatmasters) – 3:56
 "Move Any Mountain (The Bones Break Mastermix)" (remixed by Frankie Bones) – 6:11
 "Move Any Mountain (Beltram Vox)" (remixed by Joey Beltram) – 5:20
 "Move Any Mountain (Landslide Vox)" (remixed by the Kid and John) – 5:27
 "Move Any Mountain (Rude)" (remixed by the Goat) – 5:40
 "Move Any Mountain (C. mix)" (remixed by Colin Angus and Mr. C) – 6:47
 "Move Any Mountain (Beat Edit)" (remixed by the Beatmasters) – 3:30
 "Move Any Mountain (Rude Edit)" (remixed by the Goat) – 3:44
 "Move Any Mountain (Landslide Edit)" (remixed by the Kid and John) – 3:48
 "Move Any Mountain (F Troop Edit)" (remixed by F Troop) – 3:27
 "Move Any Mountain (Oz Edit)" (remixed by Paul Oakenfold) – 3:39
 "Move Any Mountain (Bang Edit)" (remixed by Bryan 'Chuck' New & 'Evil' Eddie Richards) – 3:32
 16 samples & beats – 5:39

Note: The CD version of Progeny only contains 15 tracks, it omits tracks 8–12.

The "Alta Vista" mix is the same as the "F2 Mello" mix. The "Beltram Dub" mix, as published on Progeny, is the same as the "Beltram Vox" mix. "Move Any Mountain (Land of Oz)" on Progeny is the same as the original "Pro›gen ('Land of Oz' Mix)" (1990), slightly different from "Move Any Mountain (I.R.P. in the Land of Oz)" on the 1991 12", and from "Progen 91 (I.R.P. in the Land of Oz)" on En-Tact.

Versions

Legend: p = "Pro›gen", m = "Move Any Mountain – Progen 91", e = En-tact (1990), E = En-tact (1991), P = Progeny, M = "Move Any Mountain '96"

Charts

Weekly charts

Year-end charts

Release history

References

External links
 

1990 songs
1991 singles
1992 singles
1996 singles
Acid house songs
House music songs
One Little Indian Records singles
The Shamen songs